The pugnacious burrowing scorpion (Opistophthalmus pugnax) is a species of South African scorpion.

Description 
These muddy-looking scorpions are characterized by corrugations on the last sternite, stiff hairs (setae), and highly recurved tarsal claws. Males have corrugations on the last two sternites. They grow up to 70 mm in length.

Distribution and habitat 

A fan-shaped burrow with an enlarged part for resting or consuming prey is constructed under rocks and other surface debris. It is a very common species on rocky outcrops and ridges in the north-central Free State and Gauteng provinces of South Africa.

Behaviour 
Despite its species name, it is not particularly aggressive and very rarely enters houses. The female gives birth to litters of up to 25.

References 

http://www.afpmb.org/sites/default/files/pubs/guides/field_guide.pdf
Leeming, Jonathan 2003. Scorpions of southern Africa. Struik Publishers, Cape Town. 88pp.

Scorpionidae
Scorpions described in 1876
Scorpions of Africa